Son of a Pimp is the second studio album by American rapper Mistah F.A.B. from Oakland, California. It was released on April 19, 2005 via Thizz Entertainment. Production was handled by several record producers, including Droop-E, E-A-Ski, Gennessee Lewis, Kanye West and Sean T among others. It also features guest appearances by the likes of Bavgate, E-40, G-Stack, Mac Dre (who was shot and killed 6½ months prior to the album's release), Mac Mall, Messy Marv, Miami, PSD, The Jacka, Turf Talk, and Yukmouth among others. A sequel to the album, Son of a Pimp Part 2, was released on May 27, 2016.

Track listing

References

External links

2005 albums
Mistah F.A.B. albums
Thizz Entertainment albums
Albums produced by Droop-E
Albums produced by Kanye West